121 West Trade (formerly known as the Interstate Tower) is a office high rise located at the Trade and Tryon, in Charlotte Center City, North Carolina, United States. The post modern building was designed by Kohn Pedersen Fox Associates and was completed in 1991. It also has 330,000 feet (101,000 m) of Class A office space.

See also
 List of tallest buildings in Charlotte
List of tallest buildings in North Carolina

References

Skyscraper office buildings in Charlotte, North Carolina
1991 establishments in North Carolina

Kohn Pedersen Fox buildings
Office buildings completed in 1991